Dodsworth is a 1936 American drama film directed by William Wyler, and starring Walter Huston, Ruth Chatterton, Paul Lukas, Mary Astor and David Niven. Sidney Howard based the screenplay on his 1934 stage adaptation of the 1929 novel of the same name by Sinclair Lewis. Huston reprised his stage role.

The center of the film is a study of a marriage in crisis. Recently retired auto magnate Samuel Dodsworth and his narcissistic wife Fran, while on a grand European tour, discover that they want very different things out of life, straining their marriage.

The film was critically praised and nominated for seven Academy Awards, including Best Picture, Best Actor for Huston, and Best Director for Wyler (the first of his record twelve nominations in that category), and won for Best Art Direction. In 1990, Dodsworth was included in the annual selection of 25 motion pictures added to the National Film Registry of the Library of Congress. being deemed "culturally, historically, or aesthetically significant" and recommended for preservation. Dodsworth was nominated for AFI's 100 Years...100 Movies in 1997 and 2007.

Plot

In the small Midwestern city of Zenith, Samuel "Sam" Dodsworth (Walter Huston) is a successful, self-made man: the president of Dodsworth Motors, which he founded 20 years before. Then he sells the company to retire. Although Tubby Pearson, Sam's banker and friend, warns him that men like them are only happy when they are working, Sam has no plans beyond an extended trip to Europe with his wife Fran (Ruth Chatterton), who feels trapped by their dull social life.

Meanwhile, Fran indulges in a light flirtation with a handsome Englishman (David Niven); but when he suggests it become more serious, she hastily retreats and asks Sam not to spend time in England as planned, but go on directly to Paris.

Once there, Fran begins to view herself as a sophisticated world traveler and tries to develop a high-class social life, also pretending to be much younger than she is. Sam says that people who would socialize with hicks like either of them are not really high-class, but she sees him as increasingly boring and unimaginative; he only wants to see the usual tourist sights and visit car factories. She becomes infatuated with cultured playboy Arnold Iselin (Paul Lukas), who invites her to Montreux and later Biarritz. She suggests Sam return home and allow her to spend the summer in Europe; feeling rather out of place, he consents.

Sam is happily welcomed by his old friends, as well as his daughter (Kathryn Marlowe) and new son-in-law (John Payne), who have moved into his and Fran's mansion. Before long, though, Sam realizes that life back home has left him behind—and he is tormented by the idea that Fran might have, as well. Fran tries to deny it, but Iselin confirms everything. She breaks down and begs for forgiveness. Although he still loves her, it is soon evident that they have grown far apart. In Vienna, news of the birth of their first grandchild arrives; although initially excited, Fran is displeased with the idea of being a grandmother. She eventually informs Sam that she wants a divorce, especially after the poor, but charming, young Baron Kurt von Obersdorf (Gregory Gaye) tells her he would marry her if she were free. Sam agrees.

Sightseeing aimlessly while the divorce is being arranged, Sam encounters Edith by chance in an American Express office in Naples. She invites him to stay at her Italian villa. The two rapidly fall in love. Sam feels so rejuvenated that he wants to start a new business: an airline connecting Moscow and Seattle via Siberia. He asks Edith to marry him and fly with him to Samarkand and other exotic locales on his new venture. She gladly accepts.

Meanwhile, Fran's idyllic plans are shattered when Kurt's mother (Maria Ouspenskaya) rejects his request to marry Fran. In addition to divorce being against their religion, she tells Fran that Kurt must have children to carry on the family line, and Fran would be an "old wife of a young husband". Kurt asks Fran to postpone their wedding until he can get his mother's approval; but Fran sees that it is hopeless and calls off the divorce.

However, after only a short time in Fran's now critical and demanding company, Sam realizes their marriage is irrevocably over. "Love has to stop somewhere short of suicide", he tells her. At the last moment, he gets off the ship to rejoin Edith. Sam sails back to Edith's villa where she is standing on the balcony overlooking the water. When she thinks she sees Sam on the sailboat, her eyes light up with anticipation and when the sail moves to the side revealing it is indeed him with a huge smile on his face, Edith's face changes to an equally brilliant smile.

Principal players

 Walter Huston as Sam Dodsworth
 Ruth Chatterton as Fran Dodsworth
 Paul Lukas as Arnold Iselin
 Mary Astor as Edith Cortright
 David Niven as Captain Lockert
 Gregory Gaye as Kurt Von Obersdorf

 Maria Ouspenskaya as Baroness Von Obersdorf
 Odette Myrtil as Renée De Penable
 Spring Byington as Matey Pearson
 Harlan Briggs as Tubby Pearson
 Kathryn Marlowe as Emily
 John Payne as Harry (billed as "John Howard Payne")

Production
Walter Huston appeared in the 1934 Broadway production, which co-starred Fay Bainter as Fran.

Billed in the cast as "John Howard Payne", John Payne made his first film appearance, portraying Dodsworth's son-in-law Harry and launching a screen career that lasted more than four decades.

The film was in production during Mary Astor's bitter divorce proceedings over her affair with dramatist George S. Kaufman. She kept a diary, and her husband threatened to have intimate details of the affair read into evidence at the divorce proceedings and in their child-custody battle. However, the diary entries were destroyed and could not be used. To avoid the press, Astor lived in her dressing room bungalow during part of the production, working on the film during the day and appearing in court in evening sessions. Ruth Chatterton accompanied her to court.

The film's sets were designed by art director Richard Day.

Reception

Frank S. Nugent, writing for The New York Times in September 1936, described the film as "admirable", and added that director Wyler "has had the skill to execute it in cinematic terms, and a gifted cast has been able to bring the whole alive to our complete satisfaction ... The film version has done more than justice to Mr. Howard's play, converting a necessarily episodic tale ... into a smooth-flowing narrative of sustained interest, well-defined performance and good talk."

Time magazine said it was "directed with a proper understanding of its values by William Wyler, splendidly cast, and brilliantly played".

Among the film industry's leading critics in 1936, the entertainment trade publication Variety bestowed perhaps the highest praise on the production:

Writing for The Spectator in 1936, Graham Greene gave the film a good review, describing it as "a very well-made and well-acted film". Greene criticized the director's overuse of music which he described as "almost incessant", however he praised the "naturalness" of the picture as a quality all too rare in film.

The film was named one of the year's ten best by The New York Times, and was one of the top twenty box office films of the year.

The film historian and Turner Classic Movies host Robert Osborne named Dodsworth his favorite film.

In his 2007 book Bambi vs Godzilla: On the Nature, Purpose, and Practice of the Movie Business playwright and director David Mamet cited Dodsworth as being one of four movies that he considers "perfect films" (the other three being The Godfather, A Place in the Sun and Galaxy Quest).

In 1990, Dodsworth was selected for preservation in the United States National Film Registry. In 2005, Time magazine named it one of the 100 best movies of the past 80 years.

Dodsworth currently holds an 89% rating on Rotten Tomatoes based on eighteen reviews.

Awards and nominations
At the Academy Awards, the film was nominated for seven awards, winning one.
Wins
 Best Art Direction: Richard Day
Nominations
 Outstanding Production: Samuel Goldwyn Productions
 Best Director: William Wyler
 Best Actor: Walter Huston
 Actress in a Supporting Role: Maria Ouspenskaya
 Best Sound Recording: Thomas T. Moulton
 Best Writing (Screenplay): Sidney Howard

Adaptations
Lux Radio Theatre aired a one-hour adaptation on two occasions in 1937; first on April 12, 1937, then on October 4, 1937. Huston recreated his role for both broadcasts, and both times Fran was portrayed by his wife, Nan Sunderland.

References

Further reading
 Tibbetts, John C., and James M. Welsh, eds. The Encyclopedia of Novels Into Film (2nd ed. 2005) p 103.

External links

Dodsworth essay by Daniel Eagan in America's Film Legacy: The Authoritative Guide to the Landmark Movies in the National Film Registry, A&C Black, 2010 , pages 251-253 

1936 films
1936 drama films
Adultery in films
American black-and-white films
Films scored by Alfred Newman
Films based on American novels
Films based on multiple works
American films based on plays
Films based on works by Sinclair Lewis
Films directed by William Wyler
Films set in Naples
Films set in Paris
Films set on ships
Films whose art director won the Best Art Direction Academy Award
Samuel Goldwyn Productions films
United Artists films
United States National Film Registry films
American drama films
1930s English-language films
1930s American films